Hell's Unleashed is the sixth studio album by the Swedish death metal band, Unleashed. It was released in 2002 on Century Media Records, after a five-year break from recording.

Track listing
All songs written by Unleashed, unless stated otherwise

Personnel
 Johnny Hedlund – vocals, bass
 Fredrik Folkare – guitar
 Tomas Olsson – guitar
 Anders Schultz – drums

References

External links
 
 Unleashed band website

2002 albums
Unleashed (band) albums
Century Media Records albums